Southern Championship Wrestling may refer to:

Southern Championship Wrestling, a former North Carolina-based wrestling promotion run by Greg Mosorjak
Southern Championship Wrestling (Georgia), a former Georgia-based wrestling promotion run by Jerry Blackwell
Southern Championship Wrestling, a former Tennsessee-based wrestling promotion run by Jim Crockett